Rittiporn Wanchuen (born 30 August 1995), is a Thai professional footballer who plays as a forward.

References

External links
 

1995 births
Living people
Rittiporn Wanchuen
Rittiporn Wanchuen
Association football forwards
Rittiporn Wanchuen
Rittiporn Wanchuen
Rittiporn Wanchuen
Rittiporn Wanchuen